Brian Patrick Ashby  (10 November 1923 – 5 June 1988) was the fifth Catholic Bishop of Christchurch, New Zealand. He was appointed by Pope Paul VI on 11 July 1964, resigned the see on 4 July 1985, and died on 5 June 1988. He was the leading New Zealand Catholic bishop in attempting to implement the decrees of the Vatican Council II and he was the leading bishop on social justice issues.

Early life
Ashby was born in Belfast, New Zealand, a suburb of Christchurch in 1923. He received his primary education at St Joseph's Convent, Papanui, and his secondary education at St Bede's College (to which he won a scholarship). In 1941, Ashby studied law at the University of Canterbury while working in a law office. Over the next two years, he served with the Fifth Canterbury Regiment.

When the under-20s were released for further study in 1943, he began his study for the priesthood at Holy Cross College, Mosgiel. In 1946 he was selected by Bishop Lyons for theology studies in Rome where he was ordained on 1 January 1950. In 1951 he completed his doctorate in Theology.

Priesthood
Ashby returned to Christchurch and was appointed as assistant priest in the new parish of North Timaru. In 1957 he became secretary to Bishop Joyce, the 4th Bishop of Christchurch. In 1960 Ashby was sent to London to study the techniques of the Catholic Enquiry Centre there. Ashby became the co-director of the New Zealand Catholic Enquiry Centre when it opened in Wellington in 1961. On 11 July 1964, Ashby was appointed as the Fifth Bishop of Christchurch, succeeding Bishop Joyce.

Episcopacy
Ashby was consecrated Bishop at the age of 41 (one of the youngest bishops to take office) on 5 August 1964 in the Cathedral of the Blessed Sacrament, Christchurch by Archbishop McKeefry of Wellington and the co-consecrators Archbishop Liston of Auckland and Bishop Snedden (Auxiliary Bishop of Wellington). Ashby attended the last sessions of the Second Vatican Council, an experience which placed him in an optimum position to help steer the New Zealand church through the difficult transition times following the Council.  He tried to renew diocesan structures and he placed great emphasis on making himself accessible to his people.

Ashby became the leading Catholic figure in the area of ecumenism. His work in this area was recognised in 1983 when Pope John Paul II appointed him to the Vatican Secretariat for the Promotion of Christian Unity. In 1983, Ashby was also the first New Zealand bishop to be appointed a member of the second Anglican-Roman Catholic International Commission, and was also chairman of the New Zealand Catholic Ecumenical Commission. He was the first Catholic bishop to preach in an Anglican cathedral in New Zealand and maintained an enduring personal friendship with the Anglican Bishop of Christchurch Bishop Pyatt.

Ashby was the first New Zealand bishop to implement church sanctuary alterations in the wake of the second Vatican Council. The alterations introduced into the Cathedral of the Blessed Sacramant were controversial but Ashby insisted that they followed the Council decrees.

Social justice concerns
Ashby had the role of visionary in the Catholic hierarchy and he became a significant leader in Church and community affairs. His youth, energy and charisma enabled him to take the lead on social justice issues, particularly those involving Māori-Pakeha relations, overseas aid and sporting contacts with South Africa (which he visited, to see for himself the consequences of Apartheid) Both he and his friend, Bishop Pyatt were outspoken critics of the 1981 Springbok Rugby Tour. The effect of Ashby's leadership was visible in 1981, when scarcely a priest in his diocese supported the tour.

Ashby also headed the New Zealand Catholic Commission for Evangelisation, Justice and Development which gave money to HART (Halt All Racist Tours) in 1981 and later to the Waitangi Action Committee. Both donations brought criticism and debate within the Church. Ashby's services to the community were recognised when he was awarded the Queen Elizabeth II Silver Jubilee Medal in 1977, and appointed a Commander of the Order of the British Empire in the 1985 Queen's Birthday Honours. Ashby said that he was a peaceful man but that he "owed it to my integrity to take the stands that I have taken".

Retirement and death
Ashby resigned the see on 4 July 1985 because of a stroke, after serving 21 years as Bishop of Christchurch. During his retirement he was president of the New Zealand Counter-Stroke Support Group.  In April 1988, he was diagnosed with terminal cancer and died on 5 June 1988 in the Mary Potter Hospital, Christchurch.

His Requiem Mass was concelebrated  before a congregation of 2,000 by bishops from all the New Zealand dioceses (the celebrants included Bishop John Gerry (Auxiliary Bishop of Brisbane). Ashby is interred in Christchurch's Bromley Cemetery.

Notes

See also
 Catholic Hierarchy website, ''Bishop Brian Patrick Ashby" (retrieved 25 January 2011).

People educated at St Bede's College, Christchurch
Holy Cross College, New Zealand alumni
20th-century Roman Catholic bishops in New Zealand
Participants in the Second Vatican Council
Roman Catholic bishops of Christchurch
New Zealand Commanders of the Order of the British Empire
1923 births
1988 deaths
Burials at Bromley Cemetery